Matt Wisniewski (born 1990) is an American artist and software engineer most known for creating and popularizing a style of digital collage.

Early life

Wisniewski was born and raised in Doylestown, Pennsylvania. He attended Rochester Institute of Technology where he earned a Bachelor of Science in computer science in 2012. He subsequently moved to New York City.

Career

Wisniewski achieved recognition in 2011 by combining images he found on Tumblr and FFFFOUND!. In 2015 he expressed a desire to work with his own photography more. By 2018 he had transitioned to primarily working with his own photography.

Wisniewski is colour blind.

Works

His 2014 work for W San Francisco was described as "Vibrant wall murals celebrate male and female forms against unique backdrops".

Album cover designs
 Mind Over Matter (2014)

Book cover designs
 L'Esprit de mes pères (2012). .
 Beloit Fiction Journal (2013).
 Borderlife (2016).

Publications
 Matt Wisniewski. New Statesman, 2013. With an essay by Ed Smith.
 Matt Wisniewski: Futur Couture #19. Harper's Magazine, 2013. With an essay by Charles Baxter.
 Matt Wisniewski. Economia, 2013.
 Matt Wisniewski. Financial Times, 2014. With an essay by Tara Loader Wiilkinson
 Matt Wisniewski. Landmark Magazine, 2015. With an essay by Justin Hill.
 Matt Wisniewski: Graphic #2. The Atlantic, 2016. With an essay by Moises Velasquez-Manoff.
 Matt Wisniewski: Fountain Collapse #1. Slice Literary Magazine, 2018. With an essay by Majda Gama.
 Matt Wisniewski. HuffPost, 2019. With an essay by Eve Fairbanks.
 Matt Wisniewski: Strange Matter. The Point, 2021. With an essay by S. G. Belknap.

References

External links
 
 [ Matt Wisniewski at Allmusic]

1990 births
Living people
21st-century American artists
21st-century American photographers
Commercial photographers
Collage artists